Saifullah, (also spelled Sayfullah) - , meaning sword of God, is a male Islamic given name. Originally it was an honorific award for military prowess. In modern times it may be used as a surname.

Saifullah

Males
Title
SayfAllāh al-Maslūl, name given to Khalid ibn al-Walid, one of the companions of Muhammad (sal). But the shia claim it was given to Imam Ali, cousin and son in law of Muhammad (sal) as he had the sword zulfiqar, which was passed down by god  
Emir Sayfullah, nom de guerre of Muslim Atayev (1974-2004), Islamist leader against the Russians in the North Caucasus
Emir Sayfullah, nom de guerre of Anzor Astemirov (1976–2010), Islamist leader against the Russians in the North Caucasus
Saifullah, name used by Daniel Patrick Boyd (born 1970), American alleged terrorist
Saifullah, nom de guerre of Gazi Haider (1994-2020), leader of the Hizbul Mujahideen in Kashmir

Given name
Sejfulla Malëshova (1901-1971), Albanian politician and writer
Saifullah Paracha (born 1947), Pakistani held in Guantanamo
 Saif-ur-Rehman Mansoor (died ca. 2007), Taliban commander
Saifullah Cheema, Pakistani army officer
Sayfullo Saipov, suspected terrorist

Middle name
Anwar Saifullah Khan, Pakistani politician
Salim Saifullah Khan, Pakistani politician
Qari Saifullah Akhtar, Pakistani alleged terrorist

Surname
Muhammad Saifullah (born 1943), Pakistani politician
Zafar Saifullah, Indian politician

Females
Geysar Seyfulla qizi Kashiyeva, or Geysar Kashiyeva (1893–1972), Azerbaijani painter

See also
Qilla Saifullah, fort in Pakistan
Qila Saifullah, town in Pakistan
Killa Saifullah District, Pakistan

References

Arabic masculine given names
Arabic-language surnames